Obinna Nwaneri (born 19 March 1982)  is a retired Nigerian footballer who plays as centre back or right back position but can also play as a forward.

His name, Obinna, means "Father's heart" in Igbo. He is described as mobile central defender with pace, control and timing. A natural leader, which had earned him the captain armband in Enyimba and FC Sion respectively.

His star has steadily continued to rise, first with top Nigerian side, Julius Berger, then with African Champions Enyimba, where he won the CAF champions league and then signed with Swiss club FC Sion during the 2007 January transfer window, a club he later captained before leaving the following summer.

Career breakdown
2000: Broke into a talented Julius Berger side that had an amazing turnaround season, going from barely escaping relegation the season before, to annexing the Nigerian Pepsi League crown.
2001: Had a standout season with the 'Bridge Boys', proving to be one of the League's best defenders. Berger, unfortunately, failed to retain their League title and were knocked out of the African Champions Cup.
2002: Won the Nigerian Cup with Julius Berger, after defeating Yobe Stars 3–0 in the final.
2003: Moved to League Champions Enyimba, forming a dream partnership at the back with Romanus Orjinta. Had a standout season in an historic season for Enyimba, as they won the Nigerian League for the 3rd year running and became the first Nigerian club to win the continents' most prized club trophy – The African Champions Cup.
2004: Captained Enyimba as they successfully defended their African Champions League crown, by defeating Étoile du Sahel of Tunisia with a 5–3 penalty victory. Scored the vital fifth penalty that secured the win. However, this time around, Enyimba would not win Nigerian League. Agreed personal terms with South African side Orlando Pirates in July, but the deal fell through as the clubs could not agree on a fee.
2004–05: Moved to Tunisian powerhouse Espérance, in early 2005, where he has had an outstanding season.
2005–06: Selected for the Nigerian national football team for the 2006 African Cup of Nations tournament.
2006–07: Signed for Swiss Super League team FC Sion until June 2010.A team he captained until he left the following summer.
2008: Obinna score his first ever goal for Nigeria national football team at 45 minutes during 2010 FIFA World Cup qualification – CAF Second Round against South Africa national football team.
2010: After a proposed loan spell in the United Arab Emirati football club Al Dhafra did not fell through Obinna Joined Kuwaiti club Kazma.
2011: Kazma Obinna finished his contract with Kazma and has since been linked with a host of European clubs.
2012: After being a free agent for 3 months, Obinna joined the 2010 Malaysia Super League champions, Kelantan FA. Obinna later won treble by winning Malaysian Super League, FA Cup and Malaysian Cup with Kelantan FA in his debut season.
2014: On 23 April, he was released by Kelantan FA
2015: After less than a year out the game he signs with ATM
2016: Signs with Perlis FA in Malaysian Premier League

Statistics

Club

Honours

Club

Enyimba
Nigeria Premier League: Runners-up 2003–04
African Champions League: 2003–04

FC Sion
Swiss Cup: 2008–09

Kazema SC
Kuwaiti Emir Cup: 2010–11
Kuwait Super Cup: Runners-up 2011

Kelantan
Malaysia Super League: 2012
Malaysia Cup: 2012
Malaysia FA Cup: 2012, 2013
Malaysia Charity Shield: Runners-up 2012, 2013

References

External links
Obinna Nwaneri profile at Trwfc.com

Obinna Nwaneri at Stadium Astro

1982 births
Living people
Nigerian footballers
Nigeria international footballers
2006 Africa Cup of Nations players
2008 Africa Cup of Nations players
2010 Africa Cup of Nations players
Nigerian expatriate footballers
FC Sion players
Enyimba F.C. players
Espérance Sportive de Tunis players
Bridge F.C. players
Kelantan FA players
ATM FA players
Swiss Super League players
Malaysia Super League players
Sportspeople from Lagos
Igbo sportspeople
Expatriate footballers in Switzerland
Expatriate footballers in Tunisia
Expatriate footballers in Malaysia
Nigerian expatriate sportspeople in Switzerland
Nigerian expatriate sportspeople in Tunisia
Nigerian expatriate sportspeople in Malaysia
Association football central defenders
Association football fullbacks